Wade Grant Cunningham (born 19 August 1984) is a racing driver from Auckland, New Zealand who competed in the Firestone Indy Lights Series.

Racing career

Indy Lights

Cunningham's professional career began when he won the Karting World Championship in 2003.

The following year he moved to the United States and competed in the Cooper Tires Formula Ford Zetec Championship in which he finished 5th after winning four consecutive poles and seven podium finishes. He won the 2005 Indy Lights Series championship in his rookie season for Brian Stewart Racing despite only winning a single race.

He continued with the team in 2006 and won 3 more races, including the Freedom 100 at Indianapolis Motor Speedway (becoming the first driver from New Zealand to do so) and placed third in championship points despite missing two races due to an emergency appendectomy.  While missing out on the drivers title the team was still able to claim their second consecutive entrants championship because they were able to replace Wade with a reserve driver for those events. He narrowly missed the title by 11 points and would have easily clinched his second drivers championship had he started either of those events.

He drove in the A1 Grand Prix series as practice driver for A1 Team New Zealand in the round in Taupo, New Zealand and China. He returned to the Indy Lights Series in 2007 for AGR-AFS Racing where he finished 3rd.

IndyCar Series

In December 2007 Cunningham tested an IndyCar Series machine for the first time at Sebring as a reward for his results with their satellite team in the Indy Lights Series, driving the Andretti Green Racing IndyCar normally driven by Marco Andretti.

Wade's brother Mitch made his Firestone Indy Lights Series debut (formerly the Indy Pro Series) in 2008 for Brian Stewart Racing, the same team with whom Wade had his initial success. Wade made a handful of starts in the series in 2008, both for Brian Stewart and in the Mid-Ohio double-header for the new Alliance Motorsports team.

He signed on to return to the series full-time in 2009 driving for Sam Schmidt Motorsports. Upon joining the team, he became the first driver to win a second Freedom 100 at the Indianapolis Motor Speedway.

Cunningham won again that race in 2010 in a one-race deal for the Schmidt team, becoming the only three-time winner of the Freedom 100.

Sam Schmidt announced 11 February that Cunningham would make his Izod IndyCar Series debut in 2011 with Sam Schmidt Motorsports in a three race deal. He qualified 8th on debut at Texas Motor Speedway for the Firestone Texas Twin 275s and posted a season and career best IndyCar finish at the Indy Kentucky 300 when he finished 7th a mere 0.702 seconds from the lead.

Racing record

Complete A1 Grand Prix results

American open–wheel racing results
(key) (Races in bold indicate pole position)

Indy Lights

IndyCar Series

References

External links
 
 
 Wade Cunningham Indy Pro Series/Firestone Indy Lights Statistics 
 IndyCar Driver Page

1984 births
A1 Grand Prix Rookie drivers
Karting World Championship drivers
Indy Lights champions
Indy Lights drivers
IndyCar Series drivers
Living people
New Zealand racing drivers
Sportspeople from Auckland
Toyota Racing Series drivers
Indianapolis 500 drivers
V8SuperTourer drivers
U.S. F2000 National Championship drivers
Arrow McLaren SP drivers
AFS Racing drivers
A. J. Foyt Enterprises drivers
Andretti Autosport drivers
Chip Ganassi Racing drivers